Edoardo Iachizzi (born 26 May 1998) is an Italian rugby union player. His usual position is as a Flanker and he currently plays for Vannes in Rugby Pro D2.

From 2018 to 2020 he played for Perpignan in espoirs team.

From 2017 to 2018, Iachizzi was named in the Italy Under 20 squad. 
On 26 May hw was called in Italy A squad for the South African tour in the 2022 mid-year rugby union tests against Namibia and Currie Cup XV team.
On the 28 January 2023, he was selected by Kieran Crowley to be part of an Italy 33-man squad for the 2023 Six Nations Championship. He made his debut against France.

References

External links 

All Rugby Profile

Living people
Italian rugby union players
USA Perpignan players
Rugby Club Vannes players
Rugby union locks
Rugby union flankers
1998 births
Sportspeople from Rome
Italy international rugby union players